Ľubomír Meszároš  (born 23 March 1979 in Bratislava) is a Slovak professional footballer who currently plays for SV Gols in the Austrian 1. Klasse Nord.

Club career
Meszároš spent two seasons in the Turkish Super Lig, with Elazığspor and Adanaspor, and one season in the Greek Super League with Panionios FC.

International career
Meszároš has made eight appearances for the full Slovakia national football team.

Career statistics

International goals

Honours
Slovak Superliga (2):
1999, 2009
Slovenský Pohár (1):
1999

References

External links
 

1979 births
Living people
Footballers from Bratislava
Slovak footballers
Slovakia international footballers
ŠK Slovan Bratislava players
Elazığspor footballers
Adanaspor footballers
Slovak expatriate sportspeople in Turkey
Expatriate footballers in Turkey
Panionios F.C. players
Super League Greece players
Expatriate footballers in Greece
Expatriate footballers in Austria
SK Dynamo České Budějovice players
1. FC Tatran Prešov players
FK Viktoria Žižkov players
Slovak Super Liga players
Czech First League players
Slovak expatriate sportspeople in the Czech Republic
Slovak expatriate footballers
Expatriate footballers in the Czech Republic
Association football forwards